Webber Wentzel is an African law firm headquartered in Johannesburg, South Africa. 
The firm operates in a collaborative alliance with global law firm, Linklaters.

The firm is considered a member of the "Big Five law firms" of leading South African law firms.

The firm is a level 1 Broad-Based Black Economic Empowerment (BBBEE) contributor.

History

Webber Wentzel was founded in 1868 and is the only large South African law firm to retain a traditional partnership organisation and not incorporate into a limited liability company.

In 1868, Edward Solomon starts a law practice in Eastern Cape. In 1904, Edward Solomon goes into partnership with Henry Charles Hull, Walter Webber and Charles Wentzel. In 1918, Webber & Wentzel amalgamates with Hudson & Frames to become Webber Wentzel Solomon & Friel. In 1972, Webber Wentzel Hofmeyr Turnbull and Co merges with Dumat Pitts & Blaine. In 1967, The Maitland Group, a fund administrator and fiduciary services specialist with over £140 billion of assets under administration in April 2015, was founded in Luxembourg in 1976 by former Webber Wentzel partner Eric Pfaff as the Luxembourg presence for Webber Wentzel. In 1994, Webber Wentzel merges with Bowen, Sessel & Goudvis to become Webber Wentzel Bowens. In 2008, Webber Wentzel Bowens merges with Cape Town firm, Mallinicks, to become Webber Wentzel, and the Maitland Group and Webber Wentzel ended over 31 years of formal ties. In 2012, Webber Wentzel affiliated with ALN. On 1 February 2013, Webber Wentzel entered into a collaborative alliance with global law firm, Linklaters.

Offices

Johannesburg (1888)
Cape Town (1969)

Selected awards and accolades

Notable deals

 Transaction between The Coca-Cola Company, SABMiller Plc and GFI to create the largest Coca-Cola bottler in Africa
 Lead African legal adviser in the largest transaction ever to be done in Africa, AB InBev's take-over of SABMiller
 Old Mutual plc on its Managed Separation – African homecoming (listings on the Johannesburg, London, Malawi, Namibia and Zimbabwe Stock Exchanges)
 Wal-Mart's acquisition of Massmart – entry into Africa
 Mercer Africa's (Marsh & McLennan) acquisition of Alexander Forbes
 Oceana Group's acquisition of Daybrook Fisheries in the USA
 Gold Fields' 50:50 incorporated joint venture with Asanko Gold Inc.
 Structuring of the African entities of General Electric
 Tokio Marine Holdings' acquisition of Hollard enabling it to acquire precious foothold in full-scale African expansion
 Pioneer Foods Group Ltd in respect of the firm intention offer by PepsiCo Inc. to acquire the ordinary shares by way of a scheme of arrangement or standby offer valued at ZAR 25 billion
 USD 2,1 billion combination of the majority of Barclays' African operations with Absa Group – the largest cross-border African M&A transaction in 2013
 Actis-backed Emerging Markets Knowledge Holdings' acquisitions relating to its tertiary education buy-and-build platform
 The Carlyle Group (via its Sub-Saharan Africa Fund) on various M&A transactions and fund structuring
 American Tower Corporation's acquisition of up to 723 of Telkom Kenya's transmission towers – ATC's first entry into the Kenyan market, its fifth market in Africa
 Anglo American's restructuring of its shareholding in Anglo American Platinum and its interests in De Beers (combined deal value of ZAR 87 billion)
 Vodafone Group in respect of the disposal of its indirect 34,94% interest in Safaricom to Vodacom Group for ZAR 35 billion
 Woolworths on its takeover of Australian retailer, David Jones, valued at AUD 2,14 billion, and its acquisition of Country Road
 Anglo American on the sale of the New Largo thermal coal project in South Africa to New Largo Coal
 Sibanye Stillwater in respect of its US$500 million streaming transaction with Wheaton Precious Metals International

Notable cases
In 1957 the firm advised Consolidated Diamond Mines of South-West Africa (CDM) in the Great South-West Diamond Case. CDM had been given exclusive rights to mine for diamonds in a diamond-rich area by the administrator of South West Africa, who subsequently conferred the right to Suidwes-Afrika Prospekteers. CDM successfully sued South West Africa to protect their sole right to mine.
In 1973 the firm successfully completed the case of Venkatrathnan and Another vs Officer Commanding Robben Island. In the case the court decided that prisoners were in principle entitled to study for tertiary degrees.
In 2004 the firm successfully challenged South African pharmaceutical price capping legislation in the Supreme Court of Appeal of South Africa in terms of which pharmacists, when dispensing prescription medicine, could charge a fixed fee limited to 26% and capped at R26.00.

Notable alumni
Notable alumni of the firm include:
 Bruce Cleaver, CEO of De Beers Group
 Charles Augustus Wentzel, former Chief Magistrate of the Witwatersrand
 Henry Charles Hull, former board member of Anglo American Corporation and the first Minister of Finance (South Africa)
 Sir Edward Solomon, former South African Senator and Minister of Public Works (South Africa)
 Walter Webber, former Member of Parliament for the Labour Party in Troyeville, founder and champion of the Bantu Men's Social Centre and the Joint Council of Europeans and Natives.
 Ed Southey, President of the Law Society of the Transvaal (1985 and 1986) President of Association of Law Societies of Republic of South Africa (1991)
 Stanley Sessel, former president of the Council of the Association of Law Societies
Brett Kebble, mining magnate
Sheila Camerer, South African ambassador to Bulgaria
Nicky Newton-King, chief executive officer of the JSE Limited.
Eric Pfaff, founder of the Maitland Group.

Further reading

References

External links
Webber Wentzel official site

Chambers and Partners Firm Profile

Law firms established in 1868
Law firms of South Africa
Companies based in Johannesburg